Kundan is a 1955 Indian Hindi-language social drama film produced and directed by Sohrab Modi for Minerva Movietone. The film stars Sohrab Modi, Sunil Dutt, Nimmi, Pran, Om Prakash, Kumkum, Naaz, Murad, Ulhas,Manorama. The Screenplay was by Pandit Sudarshan, with dialogues by Munshi Abdul Baqui and Pandit Sudarshan. The music was composed by Ghulam Mohammed, with lyrics by Shakeel Badayuni. Nimmi's double role in the film as mother and daughter was acclaimed critically, while Ulhas won a nomination in the Filmfare Award for Best Supporting Actor category. 

Based on Victor Hugo's 1862 novel, Les Misérables, the film had Modi playing a poverty-stricken young man who gets into trouble with the police for stealing a loaf of bread. Over the years, he avoids a policeman who is on his trail even as he tries to live an honest life.

Plot
The film starts with Kundan (Sohrab Modi) stealing a loaf of bread from a kitchen and running home with it to feed his young niece Radha, and ailing mother. He is arrested, and in court he says that he had tried to find work, begged, and in the end was forced to steal. The judge sentences him to two years in prison. His niece visits him in jail telling him of his mother's death. Kundan bends the iron rods and escapes, but is caught. He is imprisoned for a further five years for trying to escape. The second time he tries to do so, he gets an additional seven years. Kundan spends a total of fourteen years in prison doing hard labour. Radha (Nimmi) is married to Gopal (Pran) and they have a baby girl Uma. Gopal, who is in bad company, and a crook get her to part with all her jewellery and he disappears with it. Radha and her baby find refuge with a tea-stall owner (Om Prakash) and his wife (Manorama)), who employ her to work for them for minimal wages. Kundan, on release from jail, sets out to find Radha. He has been told by the jail authorities, including Inspector Sher Singh (Ulhas), a devout policeman, to keep them informed about his whereabouts and to present himself regularly at the police station. When he returns to his locality, he is unable to find Radha, and the neighbours drive him away, calling him a dacoit.
 
Kundan, on being turned away by everyone, finally finds a saviour in Gurudev (Murad), a priest, who helps him find himself and introduces him to making pottery and earning money. Kundan does well for himself and meets up with Radha and Uma. Radha dies from an illness and Kundan brings up Uma. Inspector Sher Singh meanwhile, is after him all the time. A grown Uma (Nimmi) meets Amrit (Sunil Dutt), a freedom fighter involved in the Quit India Movement against the British. Amrit and Uma fall in love, but Amrit has the police after him. In a fight between the revolutionaries and the police, Sher Singh is imprisoned by them, but subsequently let free by Kundan. Amrit gets injured and Singh tries to arrest him. Kundan knocks the policeman down and escapes through a drainage with Amrit. When the Inspector comes looking for them again, there is a confrontation between Kundan and the Inspector while Amrit lies wounded. Kundan tells Sher Singh that he will give himself up to the police if he allows Amrit to get treatment. Sher Singh agrees to let Amrit's wounds be treated and waits as the doctor attends him. When Amrit recovers, Kundan goes down to find a note written by the Inspector, in which he states that he's letting two people wanted by the police to go free, hence his only salvation for not doing his duty is to kill himself. Kundan manages to see the Inspector jumping into the river. Amrit and Uma are reunited with a repentant Gopal asking Kundan's forgiveness.

Cast
 Sohrab Modi as Kundan
 Sunil Dutt as Amrit
 Nimmi as Radha / Uma (Double Role) 
 Pran as Gopal
 Om Prakash as Uma's Foster Father
 Manorama as Uma's Foster Mother
 Ulhas as Inspector Sher Singh
 Murad as Gurudev
 Kumkum
 Naaz as young Radha / Uma

Production Crew
Modi had Art Director Rusi K. Banker design similar underground drainage sets, as in the sets of the film Les Misérables (1952). The crew included:

 Director: Sohrab Modi
 Producer: Sohrab Modi
 Screenplay: Pandit Sudarshan
 Dialogue: Munshi Abdul Baqui, Pandit Sudarshan
 Cinematographer: M. N. Malhotra, Lateef, Bhandare  
 Editor: P. Bhalchandra
 Art Director: Rusi K. Banker
 Costumes Designer: D. Aradhaye, M. V. Dubashi
 Audiographer: M. Eduljee
 Studio: Minerva Movietone
 Colour Consultant: Aba Joshi, D. Shirdhankar
 Make Up: Rajaram Saranjame 
 Choreography: Morey
 Music Director Ghulam Mohammed
 Lyrics: Shakeel Badayuni

Awards
Ulhas was nominated for Filmfare Award for Best Supporting Actor.

Soundtrack
The film had music directed by Ghulam Mohammed, with the lyrics written by Shakeel Badayuni. The playback were provided by Mohammed Rafi, Lata Mangeshkar, Manna Dey, Geeta Dutt, S. D. Batish, Mubarak Begum and Sudha Malhotra.

Song list

See also
 Adaptations of Les Misérables

References

External links

1955 films
1950s Hindi-language films
1955 drama films
Indian drama films
Films based on Les Misérables
Films directed by Sohrab Modi
Hindi-language drama films